Bradley Iles (born 23 August 1983) is a professional golfer from New Zealand who currently plays on the Nationwide Tour.

Career
Iles was born in Murupara, New Zealand. He turned professional in 2005.

Iles has never won on the Nationwide Tour, but has come close, losing in a two-hole playoff at the Knoxville Open to Kevin Johnson.

Personal
Iles got started with the game of golf at the age of 10 due to his mother's influence.

In July 2004, Iles suffered a brain injury, which sent him into a three-day coma.

In about 2006, U.S. Open Champion and fellow New Zealander Michael Campbell called Iles the "best talent to come out of New Zealand in a long time."

Professional wins (1)

Golf Tour of New Zealand wins (1)

*Note: The 2007 Bayleys Taranaki Open was shortened to 54 holes due to weather.

Playoff record
Nationwide Tour playoff record (0–1)

Team appearances
Amateur
Nomura Cup (representing New Zealand): 2003, 2005
Bonallack Trophy (representing Asia/Pacific): 2004 (winners)

References

External links

New Zealand male golfers
PGA Tour golfers
PGA Tour of Australasia golfers
Sportspeople from the Bay of Plenty Region
People from Murupara
1983 births
Living people